Penparcau Football Club are a Welsh football club from Penparcau, Ceredigion. They currently play in the Central Wales Southern Division, the fourth tier of the Welsh football league.

The club was reformed in the summer of 2017 and played in the Aberystwyth League Division One.

The club's home colours are black and white striped shirt with black shorts and socks

For the 2021–22 season the club played in the tier 3 Ardal North East and finished in 9th position.  After the end of the season the club announced they would be withdrawing from the league and for the 2022–23 season would play in the tier 4 Mid Wales Football League South Division. They cited the cost of match officials, as well as the travel expenses for players for away matches, as well as the requirement of a reserve team as their reasons for their departure.

Honours

 Aberystwyth League Division 1 - Champions (11): – 1965–66; 1968–69; 1985–86; 1988–89; 1989–90; 1990–91; 1999–2000; 2000–01; 2004–05; 2007–08; 2018–19
 Mid Wales Football League – Champions (1): 2009–10
 Mid Wales Football League Division 2 - Champions: 2019-20
 J. Emrys Morgan Cup - Winners (2): – 2007–08; 2018–19

Current squad

References

External links
https://bootsevans8.wixsite.com/penparcaufc

Football clubs in Wales
Mid Wales Football League clubs
Sport in Powys
Association football clubs established in 1909
1909 establishments in Wales
Ardal Leagues clubs
Aberystwyth League clubs